Michał Flieger (8 September 1900 – 4 June 1959) was a Polish footballer. He played in one match for the Poland national football team in 1926.

References

External links
 

1900 births
1959 deaths
Polish footballers
Poland international footballers
Place of birth missing
Association football forwards
Warta Poznań players